Jeem Boom Bhaa is a 2019 Indian Malayalam-language comedy thriller film written and directed by Rahul Ramachandran. The film is produced by Mystic Frames Productions. It stars Askar Ali, Anju Kurian, Baiju Santhosh, Aneesh Gopal, and Neha Saxena in the lead roles. The film began in August 2018.

Premise
Three close friends face three different problems and are forced to confront them on the special occasion of New Year's Eve.

Cast 
 Askar Ali as Basil Kanjikuzhi 
 Aneesh Gopal as Kunjumon Chacko
Anju Kurian as Diana
Neha Saxena as Model Dolby
Aparna Balamurali as Muth
Baiju Santhosh as Clay Ravi
 Kannan Nayar as S.I Valthsan

Marketing and controversy
The first look poster was released with lead actors holding guns. The poster created controversy as it was resembling a famous shot from Pulp Fiction. Later Rahul Ramachandran clarified on his Facebook page that it has nothing to do with the film, and the poster was created to create a hype.

The teaser trailer of the film was unveiled on March 14, 2019, by actor Dulquer Salmaan.

Reception

Critical response
The film was released on 24 May 2019. Upon release the film garnered negative reviews and Anna Mathews of The Times of India rated the movie 3.5/5 stating that Jeem Boom Bhaa doesn't have much to offer and the director Rahul seems to have created a story to somehow make a movie ."

References

External links
 

2019 films
Indian comedy thriller films
2010s Malayalam-language films